Arkadi Kremer (also known as Aleksandr Kremer or Solomon Kremer; 1865–1935) was a Russian socialist leader known as the 'Father of the Bund' (the General Jewish Workers' Union in Lithuania, Poland and Russia). This organisation was instrumental in the development of Russian Marxism, the Jewish labour movement and Jewish nationalism.

Life and career

Early life 
Arkadi Kremer was born in Švenčionys in Vilna Governorate, Russian Empire (in present-day Lithuania), into a religious family. At age 12 he moved to Vilna, where he attended Realschule (Secondary School). Kremer subsequently studied at the St. Petersburg Technological Institute and the Riga Polytechnic. In the course of his studies, Kremer became involved in radical student politics and became involved in the Polish Marxist organisation 'Proletariat'. He was first arrested in 1889. After some time in prison he was condemned to administrative exile and banned from St. Petersburg. He returned to Vilna in 1890, where he joined one of the earliest Marxist circles.

Political career 
In Vilna, Kremer quickly became the acknowledged leader of the Vilna Group, a circle of Jewish Social-Democrats from which the Bund subsequently emerged. He was instrumental in persuading Jewish Marxists (and Russian Social-Democrats more generally) to shift tactics from 'propaganda' to 'agitation' (i.e., from organising small clandestine study circles to fomenting a revolutionary mass movement and laying the groundwork for a mass party). Workers should be aided in their struggle for better working conditions, higher wages, etc. In the course of this struggle, they would develop a class consciousness and an understanding of the contradictions of capitalism, leading eventually to their political organisation and to the overthrow of the capitalist system. Kremer argued for this tactic in the influential pamphlet On Agitation (Ob Agitatsii), produced in 1893, together with the future Menshevik leader Julius Martov. This was known as the 'Vilna Programme' and greatly influenced the Russian Marxist movement and young Marxists like Vladimir Lenin. It also influenced the so-called 'Economist' faction, who, in contrast to Lenin and Martov, took from Kremer's pamphlet not the need to organise a workers' party but the need to concentrate on 'economic' struggles from which such a party might some day emerge. The conflict over 'Economism' was one of the first major controversies among Russian Social-Democrats and in some respects foreshadowed the Bolshevik/Menshevik split.

During his Vilna years, Kremer met and married Pati Matle Srednitskaia (or Srednicki) (1867–1943), a revolutionary activist in her own right.

At first, Kremer seems to have been inclined to favour economic over political agitation. As Jewish workers' circles proliferated in Russian, Lithuanian and Polish cities, some of Kremer's associates called for the creation of a unified Jewish Social-Democratic party. Kremer initially rejected this idea, believing that a political party would be the organic outcome of the workers' own economic struggle. The doyen of Russian Marxism, George Plekhanov, was instrumental in persuading Kremer to change his mind. The fact that Jewish workers in Russia would not be able to affiliate with international organisations such as the Second International unless they had a party seems to have weighed heavily with Kremer. Thus, in September 1897, Kremer and his comrades founded the General Jewish Workers' Union (Bund) in Vilna. Kremer was one of three members of its first Central Committee and was widely respected as the Bund's leader. The name hearkened back to Ferdinand Lassalle's General German Workers' Association (ADAV) of the 1860s, one of the forerunner organisations of the German Social-Democratic Party. At the same time, Kremer chose the name 'Bund' because it implied a looser federation than the term 'Party'. However, Kremer also maintained close contact with the wider Russian Social-Democratic movement. He placed less emphasis on Jewish cultural nationalism and autonomy than subsequent younger Bundist leaders like Mikhail Liber.

The Bund competed, on the one hand, with non-Marxist Jewish workers' groups influenced by Russian populism (such as Mark Natanson's 'Workers' Party for the Political Liberation of Russia', RPPOR, in Minsk), and, on the other hand, with labour Zionist organisation like Poale Zion. Although some younger Bundists were influenced by Zionism and the Bund insisted on its organisational autonomy and on Jewish cultural independence, the Bund rejected Jewish 'national separatism' and the idea of establishing a Jewish state in Palestine.

In 1898, Kremer was instrumental in bringing together various Social-Democratic groups in the Russian empire and among Russian exiles abroad to form the Russian Social-Democratic Workers' Party (RSDRP). The Bund was one of the constituent organisations of the RSDRP, and in its own view, an autonomous organisation within the RSDRP. Kremer attended the RSDRP's founding congress in Minsk and was elected to its first, short-lived Central Committee (which also comprised three members). Before long, the Committee, including Kremer, was arrested, leaving the young party in disarray. While in prison, Kremer put his technological and mathematical studies to use by developing a system of cryptography and a coding machine that came to be widely used in the Russian revolutionary movement.

Kremer was released from prison in 1900 and went into exile to work for the Bund's Foreign Committee. He first went to Geneva, Switzerland, but was expelled and moved to London, England. In 1902, Kremer made a brief, secret journey to Russia to participate in an illegal Social-Democratic conference in Białystok as the Bund's representative. At the conference, Kremer supported cultural autonomy for Jewish workers and organisational autonomy for the Bund within the RSDRP, a position the Bund also adopted at the RSDRP's Second Congress in 1903. In 1903, the Bund's position, most forcefully argued by Liber, was rejected by both Lenin and Martov, shortly to emerge as the leaders of the Bolshevik and Menshevik factions. The Bund, finding its claim to exclusive representation of Jewish workers in the Russian empire and organisational autonomy within a federally organised RSDRP rebuffed, withdrew from the Congress and from the RSDRP. This occurred before the split between Lenin and Martov over the question of party membership conditions and left Lenin with a slight majority at the Congress.

Later life and death 
When the Revolution of 1905 broke out in Russia, Kremer returned to St. Petersburg and became involved in the St. Petersburg soviet. He was arrested again in 1907, as the Revolution was winding down and the Tsar reasserted control. Released in 1908, Kremer withdrew from political activity, though he remained associated with the Bund. In 1912 Kremer emigrated to France, where he served the Bund as a foreign representative and liaison with the French Socialists. Primarily, Kremer worked as an engineer. In the bitter controversies which divided the European socialist movement with the outbreak of World War I, Kremer played a minor role, though he seems to have sided with the supporters of the Entente. In 1921, Kremer returned to Vilna, then called Wilno in newly independent Poland. Kremer taught mathematics. He and his wife Pati remained active in the Bund.  Arkadii Kremer died in 1935 and was buried with great honours by the Bundists. Pati Kremer survived until 1943. She was murdered by the Nazis when they liquidated the Wilno ghetto.

Sources
Arkadi: Zamlbukh tsum ondenk fun grinder fun 'Bund' Arkadi Kremer, 1865–1935. New York, 1942.
Frankel, J., Prophecy and Politics: Socialism, Nationalism, and the Russian Jews, 1862–1917. Cambridge, 1981.
Kremer, A., 'On Agitation' [1893]. In: Harding, N. (ed.), Marxism in Russia: Key Documents, 1879–1906. Cambridge and New York, 1983.
Mendelsohn, E., Class Struggle in the Pale: The Formative Years of the Jewish Workers' Movement in Tsarist Russia. Cambridge, 1970.
Shukman, H. (ed.), The Blackwell Encyclopedia of the Russian Revolution. Oxford, 1988.
http://www.yivoencyclopedia.org/article.aspx/Kremer_Arkadii

1865 births
1935 deaths
People from Švenčionys
People from Sventsyansky Uyezd
Jewish Lithuanian politicians
Bundists
Mensheviks
People of the Russian Revolution
Russian Social Democratic Labour Party members